Research in Phenomenology is an international peer-reviewed journal for publishing contributions in phenomenology and contemporary continental philosophy. It is edited by John Sallis and James C. Risser.

References

External links 
 

English-language journals
Philosophy journals
Publications established in 1971
Triannual journals
Continental philosophy literature
Multidisciplinary humanities journals
Brill Publishers academic journals